Istaravshan Sports Complex is a sports complex in Istaravshan, Tajikistan. Istaravshan Stadium is the main stadium at the sports complex.

In addition to the football stadium, its premises include a large sports gym, tennis courts, children's football field, martial arts areas, and a swimming pool.

On August 11, 2012, chaos ensued when a late goal by visitors Energetik Dushanbe was allowed by the referee. A pitch invasion followed, forcing the players to retreat to the changing rooms. Energetik Dushanbe abandoned the match when the pitch was cleared.

Renovation and reconstruction
On his visit to Istaravshan District, then president Emomali Rahmon attended the reopening ceremony of Istaravshan Sports Complex.

References

External links
 Page at Soccerway

2012 establishments in Tajikistan
Football venues in Tajikistan
Sughd Region
Sports venues completed in 2012